The 2019 NRL Women's Premiership is the second season of professional women's rugby league in Australia. The competition coincided with the 2019 NRL Finals Series.

All times are in AEST (UTC+10:00) on the relevant dates.

Round 1

Round 2

Round 3

Grand Final

References

External links

Results